Aappilattoq Island (old spelling: Augpilagtoq) is an uninhabited island in the Avannaata municipality in northwestern Greenland. It is one of two islands of the same name in the Upernavik Archipelago.

Geography 
Aappilattoq Island is located in Tasiusaq Bay, in the north-central part of Upernavik Archipelago, in the inner band of uninhabited islands. The island is separated from Anarusuk Island in the east by a small Ikerasaarsuk channel. The inner waterways of Tasiusaq Bay separate it from Nuuluk Island and Saattorsuaq Island in the north, and from Tasiusaq Island in the south.

The coastline of the island is undeveloped.

References

Uninhabited islands of Greenland
Tasiusaq Bay
Islands of the Upernavik Archipelago